"The Army–Navy Game" is the 20th episode of the first season of the TV series M*A*S*H, originally airing on February 25, 1973; its repeat on September 9, 1973 was the last official telecast in M*A*S*Hs first season on CBS. The episode was co-written by cast member McLean Stevenson ("Lt. Col. Henry Blake").

Plot
Excitement runs high in the camp on the day of the Army-Navy football game, with several members of the 4077th putting money into a betting pool. As the game starts, the unit comes under enemy attack, causing some damage and injuries. When a bomb falls into the compound but does not detonate, the entire camp is thrown into a panic. Lt. Col. Blake starts calling various branches of the military, trying to find out who dropped the bomb, but the people he talks to are more interested in following the game. He eventually learns that the bomb was dropped by the CIA, then sends Hawkeye and Trapper out to defuse it. However, the poorly written defusing instructions cause them to accidentally start the timer on the bomb – which explodes and fires hundreds of propaganda leaflets into the air. As life in the camp settles down, Father Mulcahy wins the football pool, having placed the only bet on Navy.

Notes
 In this episode the theme song is a different recording than prior episodes, with a much more carefree arrangement that emphasizes woodwind instruments, brass and percussion.
 The game heard and referenced in this episode is fictional, depicting a final score of Navy 42, Army 36. As of the 2022 contest, no actual Army–Navy Game has finished with this score.
 Though not acknowledged in the credits, game show host Tom Kennedy is the voice of the football commentator heard throughout this episode. Kennedy verified this in a 2003 interview.
 The radio announcer says it is the 53rd Army–Navy game. The 53rd game was played in 1952, with Navy winning 7–0.

References

External links
 

M*A*S*H (season 1) episodes
1973 American television episodes